Dawid Tomaszewski (born 21 November 1980 in Gdańsk, Poland), is a Polish art fashion designer who divides his time between London, United Kingdom and Berlin, Germany.

Life and works
Tomaszewski studied at London College of Fashion and Akademie der Künste Berlin. He also studied history of art at University of Fine Arts in Poznań.

In 2008 he took part in a TV show the next fashion talent and was selected to design a bag for Design Hotels. In the same year he designed a charity T-shirt for Hallhuber.

The following year brought the Designer for tomorrow competition, where he got into the final.

At the end of 2008 he launched a label under his own name. He was awarded with Young designer award  in January 2010. Additionally he exhibited at the Premium exhibition in Berlin. That collection brought him several publications in Vogue, Elle, Vanity Fair, and other magazines.

The Spring/Summer 2011 collection Torqued Elipses, inspired by renowned artist Richard Serra brought a great deal of interest toward his label. It was presented at the Mercedes-Benz Fashion Week Berlin and Fashion Week Poland in Łódź.

Contests
2005	Awarded with „Zlota Kredka”, Lodz (Poland)
2008	Finalist at „Designer For Tomorrow“, Berlin
2009	Awarded with „Premium Young Designer Award“, Berlin
2011	Awarded with honorary Award „Golden Thread“, Lodz (Poland)

Collections
 S/S 2010   “REFLECTION”
 F/W 2010/11 “CREPSCULAR MAZE”
 S/S 2011   "TORQUED ELLIPSES”
 F/W 2011/12 "KALEIDOSCOPE“
 S/S 2012   "VANITAS FLOWERS"
 F/W 2012/13 "APOCALYPSE"

References

External links
official website
Michal Martychowiec
Vogue.com
Elle Germany
Grazia 

Living people
Alumni of the London College of Fashion
Polish fashion designers
British fashion designers
German fashion designers
Businesspeople from Gdańsk
1980 births